St. Matthew's by the Bridge Episcopal Church is a parish church in the Episcopal Diocese of Iowa. The church is located in Iowa Falls, Iowa, United States. The parish was established in 1886, and the church building was listed on the National Register of Historic Places in 1993.

Architecture
The church was designed by Robert Layton who was an industrial arts teacher in Iowa Falls. He was born in England and when he visited his home country in 1912 he made sketches of several village churches. From these sketches he drew up the plans for St. Matthew's. Louis and Ernie Welden, two of his students, assisted with making the blueprints.

The building is located along the Iowa River. Because of its rather precarious location, parishioners often refer to the church as St. Matthew's on the Brink. It is a wood-frame structure that is rectangular in shape and measures . The exterior is covered with stucco and the gable ends give a simple simulated half-timbered effect. An addition with a shed roof was added onto the rear of the church in the 1960s to provide space for the vicar's study, classrooms, and storage.

The interior remains basically unchanged since it was first built. The altar is along the east wall of the sanctuary. The aisle is left of center with the pews along the north wall. The structural system on the inside consists of King posts, Queen posts, collar beams and struts which enhance the vertical character of the space. The stained glass window over the altar depicts the Ascension of Jesus and was added in 1965. Four other windows depicting Apostles were added between 1980 and 1987. The building is significant for its simple design in the Tudor Revival mode.

References

Religious organizations established in 1886
Churches completed in 1913
20th-century Episcopal church buildings
Episcopal church buildings in Iowa
Iowa Falls, Iowa
Churches in Hardin County, Iowa
National Register of Historic Places in Hardin County, Iowa
Churches on the National Register of Historic Places in Iowa
Tudor Revival architecture in Iowa
1886 establishments in Iowa